Lieutenant Colonel Saeed ul-Mulk Nawab Sir Muhammad Ahmad Said Khan, Nawab of  Chhatari  also generally referred to as Nawab of Chhatari  (12 December 1888 – 1982) was Governor of the United Provinces, Chief Minister of United Provinces, President of the Executive Council of the Nizam of Hyderabad (i.e. Prime Minister of Hyderabad) and Chief Scout of India.

Early life and family
He was born in a Lalkhani family to Nawab Mohammad Abdul Ali Khan, the Nawab of Chhatari on 12 December 1888 in Chhatari, United Province of British India. He did his education from Muhammadan Anglo-Oriental College of Aligarh. He was married to daughter of his own uncle Nawab Abdul Samad Khan Bahadur, the Nawab of Talibnagar. He had two sons, Rahat Saeed Khan and Farhat Sayeed Khan. The younger son, Farhat Sayeed Khan, was noted for his interest in Hindustani classical music and he studied music at the Sangeet Research Academy, Kolkata. The family moved to Pakistan shortly after the Partition of India, and the elder son (Rahat Saeed Chattari) became a Senator of the Pakistan National Senate.

Council to Government
From 17 May 1923 to 11 January 1926 the Nawab was a Minister in the Cabinet of the United Provinces, then in 1931 he returned as Minister of Agriculture there. Like other great Muslim zamindars, including the Raja of Salempur, was a trusted ally of the British administration of the United Provinces and was appointed acting Governor for some seven months, from April to November 1933. The Government of India Act 1935, formulated after a series of round table conferences, came into effect on 1 April 1937, and the Nawab of Chhatari, as leader of the National Agriculturist Parties, was invited to form a Cabinet, and was briefly chief minister during 1937. He soon stepped down to become Minister of Home Affairs in the United Provinces Government, with a salary of Rs. 2,500.

Nawab Chhatari attended the first Round Table Conference, held in St. James's Palace in London on 12 November 1930. The Muslim Delegation was led by the Aga Khan and others, including Muhammad Ali Jinnah, Sir Mohammad Shafi, Maulana Muhammad Ali, Dr Shafat Ali, Sir Muhammad Zafarullah Khan, the Nawab of Chhatari, and Fazlul Huq.

The Nawab of Chhatari was a member of India's National Defence Council from July to August 1941. He resigned from this to accept the post of President of the Hyderabad Executive Council, effectively Prime Minister of the important princely state of Hyderabad.

Disquiet with Jinnah
The Nawab of Chhatari attended the third open session of the All-India Muslim League, held in the Pandal at Lalbagh, Lucknow, on Sunday, 17 October 1936, with Jinnah presiding. The meeting was also attended by Maulana Shaukat Ali, Moulana Hasrat Mohani, Maulana Zafar Ali Khan, Dr Syed Husain, Raja Gazanfar Ali Khan, Khan Bahadur Kuli Khan, Fazlul Huq, Nawab Jamshed Ali Khan, and others.

Prime Minister of Hyderabad
Nawab of Chhatari was appointed President of the Executive Council of the Nizam of Hyderabad (i.e. Prime Minister of Hyderabad) in August 1941. He served on this post from September 1941 to 1 November 1947.

On 6 September 1941, Nizam of Hyderabad, praised Nawab of Chhatari as able administrator. In 1944 Nawab of Chhatari was granted the title of Saeed-ul-Mulk by H.E.H. The Nizam of Hyderabad. On 25 November 1945, Nawab of Chhatari laid the foundation stone of the Institution of Engineers (India), A.P. State Center (Visvesvarayya Bhavan).

In 1946 the Nizam of Hyderabad suggested to the Viceroy of India that the Nawab of Chhatari should be appointed Governor of the Central Provinces and Berar.

Chhatari delegation
On 11 July 1947, after the Nizam had seen the pending Indian Independence Bill, which did not offer the possibility of Dominion status to any of the princely states, an option he had pressed for, he decided to send a delegation to Delhi headed by the Nawab of Chhatari to meet the Viceroy, Lord Mountbatten of Burma. On 17 August 1947 the Nawab wrote to Mountbatten expressing the wish to enter into negotiations on the future of Hyderabad.

In August 1947 Sir Walter Monckton, a Constitutional advisor to the Nizam and the Nawab of Chhatari, tendered his resignation to the Nizam, prompted by an attack by Razakars and Ittehad-ul-Muslimeen, but the resignation was not accepted.

On 27 October 1947 Razakars and Ittehad-ul-Muslimeen staged a demonstration at the houses of the members of delegation, Monckton, the Nawab, and Sir Sultan Ahmed, making it impossible for them to leave for Delhi as intended. The discussions that followed bore no fruit, and on 1 November the Nawab of Chhatari, finding his position intolerable, resigned as President of the Executive Council. Monckton also insisted on resigning.

On 21 December 1947 Gandhi held talks with the Nawab of Chhatari, H. S. Suhrawardy, Brijlal Nehru, Rameshwari Nehru, Sheikh Abdullah, Begum Abdullah, Dr. Saifuddin Kitchlew, Bakshi Ghulam Mohammad, the Prince of Kutch, the Maharaja of Bhavnagar, Anantrai Pattani and others.

In a radio speech on 23 September 1948, the Nizam said "In November last, a small group which had organized a quasi-military organization surrounded the homes of my Prime Minister, the Nawab of Chhatari, in whose wisdom I had complete confidence, and of Sir Walter Monkton, my constitutional Adviser, by duress compelled the Nawab and other trusted ministers to resign, and forced the Laik Ali Ministry on me. This group headed by Kasim Razvi had no stake in the country or any record of service behind it. By methods reminiscent of Hitlerite Germany it took possession of the State, spread terror ... and rendered me completely helpless."

Public life
He served as Chancellor of Aligarh Muslim University from December 1965 to 6 January 1982 and as Chief Scout of the All India Boy Scouts Association from 1955 to 1982.

Time line

Autobiography
Yad-e-Ayyam (1949) is the autobiography of Nawab of Chhatari Muhammad Ahmad Said Khan. In this book, the writer has given glimpses of his life and experiences in a direct and artless manner.

See also
 Lalkhani
 List of Governors of the United Provinces

References

External links
 Karwaan-e-Aligarh : Nawab Chattari
 List of Governors of Uttar Pradesh
 Text of Memorandum submitted by 14 Muslim leaders of India to Dr Frank P. Graham, United Nations Representative 14 August 1951
 Text of Memorandum Submitted by Muslim leaders of India to Dr Frank P. Graham

1888 births
1982 deaths
People from Aligarh
Governors of Uttar Pradesh
Indian Knights Grand Cross of the Order of the British Empire
Knights Commander of the Order of the Star of India
Knights Commander of the Order of the Indian Empire
Indian knights
Scouting and Guiding in India
Place of death missing
Administrators in the princely states of India
Indian royalty
20th-century Indian Muslims
Uttar Pradesh politicians
Aligarh Muslim University
Aligarh Muslim University alumni
Prime Ministers of Hyderabad State